Kingdom is an EP by the Polish death metal band Vader. It was released on 21 August 1998 in Japan by Avalon Marquee, and in United States, Europe, and Poland on 10 November 1998 via Pavement Music, Metal Mind, and System Shock/Impact Records.

Kingdom was recorded, and mixed in July, August, and December 1997, and February 1998 at Selani Studio in Olsztyn, and 2.47 Studio in Warsaw. Enhanced track contains PC CD-ROM Data track with video for "Incarnation" in Video For Windows format, encoded using four different quality settings. Piotr "Peter" Wiwczarek talked about remixes on the album, saying:

Track listing

Personnel
Production and performance credits are adapted from the album liner notes.

Release history

References

Vader (band) albums
1998 EPs
Metal Mind Productions albums